The U.S. House Committee on Energy and Commerce Subcommittee on Health is a subcommittee within the Committee on Energy and Commerce.

Jurisdiction
The House Subcommittee on Health has general jurisdiction over bills and resolutions relating to public health and quarantine; hospital construction; mental health; biomedical research and development; health information technology, privacy, and cybersecurity; public health insurance (Medicare, Medicaid) and private health insurance; medical malpractice and medical malpractice insurance; the regulation of food, drugs, and cosmetics; drug abuse; the Department of Health and Human Services; the National Institutes of Health; the Centers for Disease Control; Indian Health Service; and all aspects of the above-referenced jurisdiction related to the Department of Homeland Security. As a Standing Subcommittee of the House Energy and Commerce Committee, it holds regular meetings and performs any functions assigned to it by that committee's rules in addition to those assigned to it by the House Rules.

Members, 118th Congress

Historical membership rosters

115th Congress

116th Congress

117th Congress

References

External links
Official Homepage 

Energy Health

Parliamentary committees on Healthcare